Peer-to-peer web hosting is using peer-to-peer networking to distribute access to webpages. This is differentiated from the client–server model which involves the distribution of web data between dedicated web servers and user-end client computers. Peer-to-peer web hosting may also take the form of P2P web caches and content delivery networks.

Comparison

See also
 WebRTC - a web standard for peer-to-peer communication between web browsers
 Freesite – a site on Freenet
 Cloud computing
 Decentralized computing

Notes

References

File sharing
Peer-to-peer computing
Web hosting